Kępno is a non-operational PKP railway station in Kępno (Pomeranian Voivodeship), Poland.

Lines crossing the station

Train services
The station is served by the following services:

Intercity services (IC) Poznań - Ostrów Wielkopolski - Kępno - Lubliniec - Częstochowa - Kraków 
Intercity services (TLK) Poznań - Ostrów Wielkopolski - Kępno - Lubliniec - Częstochowa - Kraków 
Regional services (R) Poznań - Kluczbork
Regional services (KW) Poznań – Jarocin – Kępno

References 

Kępno article at Polish Stations Database, URL accessed at 21 March 2006

Railway stations in Pomeranian Voivodeship
Disused railway stations in Pomeranian Voivodeship
Słupsk County